The 2004 Indonesia Open in badminton was held in Jakarta, from December 13 to December 19, 2004. It was a five-star tournament and the prize money was US$250,000.

Final results

References
http://www.tournamentsoftware.com/sport/tournament.aspx?id=82AC2EB6-9701-48A9-BE17-2256ED54E346

Indonesia Open (badminton)
Indonesia
Sports competitions in Jakarta
2004 in Indonesian sport